The Agnis people (or Anyi) are an Akan people living in West Africa. There are approximately 1,200,000 of them, mainly in the Ivory Coast. They also live in Ghana. They were the first people, in this region, to have come into contact with the European colonizers during the 18th century.

Ethnonymy 
According to different sources, multiple forms of their name can be observed: Agnis, Ani, Anya, Anyi, Anyis, Ndenie.

History

Origin 
The Agnis people originated from the Nile River Valley. They have kept the name of the first verified tribe to have founded Ta-Mery (The Beloved Land, in Lower Egypt): The Anis, coming from Ta-Khent (first Land, the beginning, in Ancient Ethiopia), which is also called Ta-Neter (The divine land). Agnis kings held the title of Amon, name of the demiurgic figure in Egyptian cosmogony: Amon Azenia (16th century), Amon Tiffou (17th century), Amon Aguire (19th century).

At the beginning of the 18th century, the first Agnis, coming from the Ashanti kingdom from Ghana, crossed the Ivorian frontier with another group of Akans. When they got to the Aby lagoon, they founded the Indenie kingdom, the Sanwi kingdom as well as the Moronous kingdom with the Mrôfo Agnis.

It is important to note that other subgroups exist, like the Agnis-Assonvon near Ebilassokro, in the East of the Ivory Coast.

Today 
11% of Agnis live in Abengourou: the main city in the old Indenie kingdom. The rest of the people is spread out over the regions of N'zi-Comoé, Zanzan, the Sanwi kingdom as well as a minority in Ghana.

Southern cities 
From 1990 on, a social divide in those big cities has emerged: the forest peoples gathered in the areas the savannah peoples mainly migrated to.

Culture

Leadership
The Akan people generally operate under a monarchial system, which is also true for the Anyi. Before France colonized the regions inhabited by the Anyi there were three castes: nobility, freemen, and slaves. Today there is usually a local headman, who is directed by a council of elders and who represents his constituency in regional politics. Like other Akan peoples, the Anyi have a highly stratified society that includes a hierarchical political administration with titled officials who proudly display their rank and power. The Anyi are a matrilineal people, and women have relatively high social status in both the political and economic arenas.

Society

The Anyi live in loose neighborhoods of family housing complexes which are generally spread apart. Funerary images and monuments are the preferred forms of art of the Anyi. A family often displays its affluence through the decadence of its memorials as greater beauty is thought to indicate greater respect to those being memorialized.

Family
To marry a suitor must provide three things:
 O-Bla-kale: financial assistance for education maintenance of the bride
 Adyia-tila: to purchase the trousseau
 Be-ti-sika: binds the girl and her parents

Adultery is frowned upon and at one time people would be banished from villages due to it and even put to death.

The women have to admit how many lovers they have had, to save both their own lives and the ones of their children. The husbands can then decide to forgive them or not.

Religion
The Anyi follow a traditional belief Akan religion and also Islam and Christianity. In the traditional belief Akan religion living one's life so that one will be remembered and respected as an ancestor is a primary motivation. Their religious system is based upon the continued honoring of one's departed ancestors. When a person passes away an elaborate ceremony follows, involving ritual washing, dressing the deceased in fine garments and gold jewelry to be laid in state for up to three days, and a mourning period that allows the family and community to show their respect for the departed in order to guarantee a welcome into the spirit world.

Among the Agnis people, the féticheur is called Kômian. In the Akan societies of Ghana and on the Ivorian Coast, Kômian qualifies everyone with a knowledge of the occult. Kômians can teach their knowledge to the monarchs or predict the future. Their magical/religious trances allow them to learn concepts that a mere mortal would never be able to. Kômians are gathered in secret societies.

Language 
The Agnis language is part of the Niger-Congo languages. Allegedly, there are 250 000 speakers in the Sud-Comöe.

Economics
Anyi operate primarily under an agricultural economy which revolves around banana and taro production. Yams are also an important staple crop. Many locally grown crops were introduced from the Americas during the Atlantic slave trade. These include maize, manioc, peppers, peanuts, tomatoes, squash, and sweet potatoes. Farm animals include sheep, goats, chickens, and dogs. Markets which are primarily run by women take place every four days and are the center of the local economy. Local produce and craft items are sold alongside imported goods. Palm oil is sold as a commodity on the international market. Forestry work is also practiced by the Anyi.

References

Further reading
 General Anyi Information
 Detailed Report on the Anyi (French)

Akan
Ethnic groups in Ivory Coast
Ethnic groups in Ghana